Georges Gschwind (27 August 1909 – 14 March 1995) was a Swiss rower. He competed in the men's coxed pair event at the 1936 Summer Olympics.

References

1909 births
1995 deaths
Swiss male rowers
Olympic rowers of Switzerland
Rowers at the 1936 Summer Olympics
Place of birth missing